Arlen is a surname. Notable people with the surname include:

Harold Arlen (1905–1986), American musical composer
Margaret Arlen, American talk show host
Michael Arlen (1895–1956), Armenian novelist and short story writer
Richard Arlen (1899–1976), American actor

See also
Arlen (given name)
Arlen (disambiguation)